Glynn Alan Harrison (born May 25, 1954) is a former American football running back who played one season with the Kansas City Chiefs of the National Football League. He was drafted by the San Diego Chargers in the ninth round of the 1976 NFL Draft. He played college football at the University of Georgia and attended Columbia High School in Decatur, Georgia.

References

External links
Just Sports Stats
College stats

Living people
1954 births
Players of American football from Atlanta
American football running backs
Georgia Bulldogs football players
Kansas City Chiefs players